The following lists events that happened during 2009 in Zimbabwe.

Incumbents
 President: Robert Mugabe 
 Prime Minister: Morgan Tsvangirai 
 First Vice President: Joice Mujuru
 Second Vice President: Joseph Msika (until 4 August), John Nkomo (starting 23 December)

Events

January
 January 29 - Zimbabwe allows the use of foreign currencies alongside its dollar.
 January 31 - Movement for Democratic Change President Morgan Tsvangirai agrees to become Zimbabwe's Prime Minister on February 11 in a deal with President Robert Mugabe.
<<Susan Tsvanerai (nee Mhundwa) wife of Morgan Tsvangerai dies in an automobile accident and the Robert Mugabe government is suspected of involvement or attempts to cover up the facts surrounding the event.

February
 February 5 - Zimbabwe's House of Assembly allows power-sharing between the African National Union – Patriotic Front and the Movement for Democratic Change.

References

 
2000s in Zimbabwe
Years of the 21st century in Zimbabwe
Zimbabwe
Zimbabwe